is a Japanese male  singer and songwriter. He is a member of the music unit After the Rain.

The origin of his name is from the word Sora because he likes to look at the sky and the intonation is the same as panda.

Biography 
Soraru was born on 3 November 1988 in Miyagi Prefecture, Japan. He started activities on Niconico in 2008 and began posting videos on YouTube in 2015. His CD release in addition to video posting, Niconico live broadcasting, live activities, etc.

Discography

Limited Single

Single

Album

Solo Album

Mini Album

Collab Album

References

External links 

 

1988 births
Living people
Japanese male singers
People from Miyagi Prefecture
Utaite
Japanese YouTubers